is a Japanese politician who has served as the Chairman of the Japanese Communist Party (JCP) since 24 November 2000.

Early life 

Shii was born in Yotsukaidō in Chiba Prefecture, the son of two schoolteachers. He graduated with the Bachelor of Engineering degree in Physics and Engineering from the University of Tokyo. He joined the JCP during his first year at the University and became an active participant in the party's student wing. After graduation, he got a job in the JCP-Tokyo Committee to lead Waseda University's youth student movement. He worked in the Central Committee of the JCP from 1982.

Political career 
In 1990, Shii became the head of the party's Secretariat. In 1993, he was elected as a member of the House of Representatives for the first time for Chiba 1st district, then a multi-member electoral district with five slots, narrowly coming in last at 5th place with just 1,020 votes over sixth-place LDP candidate Kazuo Eguchi.

Shii became the party's leader in 2000.

In 2006, Shii became the first JCP chairman to visit South Korea, where he traveled to an international conference of Asian political parties. He visited the site of Seodaemun Prison and paid tribute to the memory of Korean anti-colonial activists who were imprisoned during the period of Japanese colonialism. Shii also met the speaker of the National Assembly, the chairman of the Uri Party, and the floor leader of the Grand National Party. He also became the first JCP leader to visit the United States, doing so in April 2010.

In early 2023, it was rumored that Shii was facing turmoil within his own party due to his failure to gain the party traction and his length of leadership. Former senior party official Nobuyuki Matsutake called it "far from the common sense of the people" for Shii to hold onto his position for over 20 years.

Political positions

Foreign relations 
In 2020, under Shii's leadership, the Japanese Communist Party denounced the Chinese government for its activities in the East China Sea, in the South China Sea, and elsewhere in the Asia-Pacific region. A position paper issued by the party said that China's "great-power chauvinism and hegemonism" were "an adverse current to world peace and progress." At the party's conference in Atami, Shizuoka Prefecture, Shii said that "the Chinese leadership’s mistake is extremely serious. That action does not deserve the name of the Communist Party." The Japanese and Chinese communist parties had previously been diverging for decades.

He has been sanctioned by Russia over his support for Ukraine.

Personal life 
Shii plays the piano; he has said music is "a part of  life" and seriously considered becoming a musician. When he was about to begin university, he considered majoring in music or physics, and chose physics in the end. Shii says his favorite composers are Franz Schubert and Dmitri Shostakovich. Despite being on starkly opposite ends of the ideological spectrum, Shii took part in a dialogue with former Prime Minister Junichiro Koizumi in 2020, where they discussed their mutual love for classical music.

Works

References

External links 
  
 
 Interview with C. B. Liddell in Metropolis magazine. Published 15 January 2009.
 Kazuo Shii: Comments from the Japanese Communist Party on the upcoming election. YouTube video (in English) of Kazuo Shii discussing the 2014 Japanese general election. Uploaded 8 December 2014.

1954 births
Living people
Members of the House of Representatives (Japan)
Japanese Communist Party politicians
Politicians from Chiba Prefecture
University of Tokyo alumni
21st-century Japanese politicians